Ripazepam is a pyrazolodiazepinone derivative structurally related to certain benzodiazepine drugs, especially zolazepam. It has anxiolytic effects.

See also 
Benzodiazepine

References 

GABAA receptor positive allosteric modulators
Lactams
Pyrazolodiazepines